Gerard Montgomery Blue (January 11, 1887 – February 18, 1963) was an American film actor who began his career as a romantic lead in the silent era; and for decades after the advent of sound, he continued to perform as a supporting player in a wide range of motion pictures.

Early life
Blue was born in Indianapolis, Indiana to an Irish mother, Orphalena Lousetta Springer, while his father William Jackson Blue was believed to be half French and part Cherokee and Osage Indian. He had three brothers; Charles Bertram, Leroy, and William Morris. His father was a Civil War veteran, and served as a scout for Buffalo Bill. 

When his father died in a railroad collision, his mother could not rear four children alone, so Blue and one of his brothers were admitted to the Indiana Soldiers' and Sailors' Children's Home.  He eventually worked his way through Purdue University in West Lafayette, Indiana. 

He played football and worked as a fireman, boilermaker, coal miner, cowpuncher, ranch hand, circus rider, lumberjack, and day laborer at the studios of D.W. Griffith.

Career
Blue had no theatrical experience when he came to the screen. His first movie was The Birth of a Nation (1915), in which he was a stuntman and an extra. Next, he played another small part in Intolerance (1916). He also was a stuntman or stand-in for Sir Herbert Beerbohm Tree during the making of Macbeth (1916). Gradually moving to supporting roles for both D.W. Griffith and Cecil B. DeMille, Blue earned his breakthrough role as Danton in Orphans of the Storm, starring sisters Lillian and Dorothy Gish. Then, he rose to stardom as a rugged romantic lead along with top leading actresses such as Clara Bow, Gloria Swanson, and Norma Shearer. He most often acted with Marie Prevost, with whom he made several films in the mid-1920s at Warner Bros. Blue portrayed the alcoholic doctor who finds paradise in MGM's White Shadows in the South Seas (1928). Blue became one of the few silent stars to survive the sound revolution; however, he lost his investments in the stock market crash of 1929.

He rebuilt his career as a character actor, working until his retirement from films in 1954, and he played character roles in various television series until 1960, mostly Westerns, such as Annie Oakley. From the mid-1930s, he was a contract player at Warner Bros., working as in character parts and as an extra.

One of his more memorable roles was as the sheriff in Key Largo opposite Lionel Barrymore.

For his contributions to the motion pictures industry, Monte Blue received a star on the Hollywood Walk of Fame at 6290 Hollywood Boulevard on February 8, 1960.

Personal life
Blue divorced his first wife in 1923 and married Tova Jansen the following year. He had two children, Barbara Ann and Richard Monte. During the later part of his life, Blue was an active Mason and served as the advance man for the Hamid-Morton Shrine Circus. In 1963, while on business in Milwaukee, Wisconsin, he died after suffering a heart attack attributed to complications from influenza. He is interred next to his mother-in-law, actress Bodil Rosing, at Forest Lawn Memorial Park in Glendale, California.

Selected filmography

 The Birth of a Nation (1915) as Minor Role (uncredited)
 The Absentee (1915) as Ignorance
 The Wild Girl from the Hills (1915, Short)
 Ghosts (1915) as Bohemian in Paris
 The Noon Hour (1915, Short) as Ada's Brother
 Editions de Luxe (1915, Short) as Conny Peters - Swindler 
 For His Pal (1915, Short) as Jo Price
 Hidden Crime (1915, Short) as Grant - the Grazer
 The Family Doctor (1915, Short) as Dr. John Montrose
 Martyrs of the Alamo (1915) as Defender of the Alamo (uncredited)
 The Price of Power (1916) as Minor Role (uncredited)
 The Man Behind the Curtain (1916) (uncredited)
 The Devil's Needle (1916) as Bartender (uncredited)
 Hell-to-Pay Austin (1916) as Minor Role (uncredited)
 Intolerance (1916) as The Strike Leader
 The Vagabond Prince (1916) as Peasant (uncredited)
 The Microscope Mystery (1916) as Jud
 The Matrimaniac (1916, Short) as Assistant Hotel Manager (uncredited)
 Jim Bludso (1917) as Joe Bower
 Besty's Burglar (1917) as Victor Gilpin
 Hands Up! (1917) as Dan Tracy
 Wild and Woolly (1917) as One of Wild Bill's Men (uncredited)
 Betrayed (1917) as Pepo Esparenza
 The Man from Painted Post (1917) as Slim Carter
 The Ship of Doom (1917) as Martin Shaw
 The Red, Red Heart (1918) as Billy Porter
 Riders of the Night (1918) as 'The Killer' Jed
 M'Liss (1918) as Mexican Joe Dominguez
 The Only Road (1918) as Pedro Lupo
 Hands Up (1918, Serial)
 Till I Come Back to You (1918) as American Doughboy
 Johanna Enlists (1918) as Pvt. Vibbard
 The Romance of Tarzan (1918) as Juan
 The Eyes of Mystery (1918)* (uncredited; Blue appears on lobby poster with Edith Storey)
 The Goddess of Lost Lake (1918) (uncredited)
 The Squaw Man (1918) as Happy
 Romance and Arabella (1919) as Harry Atteridge
 Pettigrew's Girl (1919) as Pvt. William Pettigrew
 Rustling a Bride (1919) as Nick McCredie
 Told in the Hills (1919) as Kalitan
 In Mizzoura (1919) as Sam Fowler
 Everywoman (1919) as Love
 Too Much Johnson (1919) as Billy Lounsberry
 The Thirteenth Commandment (1920) as Bayard Kip
 A Cumberland Romance (1920) as Sherd Raines
 Something to Think About (1920) as Jim Dirk
 The Jucklins (1921) as Bill Hawes
 The Kentuckians (1921) as Boone Stallard
 A Perfect Crime (1921) as Wally Griggs
 A Broken Doll (1921) as Tommy Dawes
 Moonlight and Honeysuckle (1921) as Ted Musgrove
 The Affairs of Anatol (1921) as Abner Elliott
 Orphans of the Storm (1921) as Danton
 Peacock Alley (1922) as Elmer Harmon
 My Old Kentucky Home (1922) as Richard Goodloe
 Broadway Rose (1922) as Tom Darcy
 The Tents of Allah (1923) as Chiddar Ben-Ek
 Brass (1923) as Philip Baldwin
 Main Street (1923) as Dr. Will Kennicott
 The Purple Highway (1923) as Edgar Prentice, aka Edgar Craig
 Defying Destiny (1923) as Jack Fenton
 Lucretia Lombard (1923) as Stephen Winship
 The Marriage Circle (1924) as Dr. Franz Braun
 Loving Lies (1924) as Captain Dan stover
 Mademoiselle Midnight (1924) as Owen Burke / Jerry Brent
 How to Educate a Wife (1924) as Ernest Todd
 Daughters of Pleasure (1924) as Kent Merrill
 Revelation (1924) as Paul Granville
 Being Respectable (1924) as Charles Carpenter
 Her Marriage Vow (1924) as Bob Hilton
 The Lover of Camille (1924) as Jean Gaspard Deburau
 The Dark Swan (1924) as Lewis Dike
 Recompense (1925) as Peter Graham
 Kiss Me Again (1925) as Gaston Fleury
 The Limited Mail (1925) as Bob Wilson / Bob Snobson
 Red Hot Tires (1925) as Al Jones
 Hogan's Alley (1925) as Lefty O'Brien
 The Man Upstairs (1926) as Geoffrey West
 Other Women's Husbands (1926) as Dick Lambert
 So This Is Paris (1926) as Dr. Paul Giraud
 Across the Pacific (1926) as Monte
 Wolf's Clothing (1927) as Barry Baline
 The Brute (1927) as Easy Going Martin Sondes
 Bitter Apples (1927) as John Wyncote
 The Black Diamond Express (1927) as Dan Foster
 The Bush Leaguer (1927) as Buchanan 'Specs' White
 One Round Hogan (1927) as Robert Emmett Hogan
 Brass Knuckles (1927) as Zac Harrison
 Across the Atlantic (1928) as Hugh Clayton
 White Shadows in the South Seas (1928) as Dr. Matthew Lloyd
 Conquest (1928) as Donald Overton
 The Greyhound Limited (1929) as Monte
 No Defense (1929) as Monte Collins
 From Headquarters (1929) as Happy Smith
 Skin Deep (1929) as Joe Daley
 The Show of Shows (1929) as Condemned Man (segment "Rifle Execution")
 Tiger Rose (1929) as Devlin
 Isle of Escape (1930) as Dave Wade
 Those Who Dance (1930) as Dan Hogan
 The Flood (1931) as David Bruce
 The Big Gamble (1931) as Policeman (uncredited)
 The Stoker (1932) as Dick Martin
 Officer Thirteen (1932) as Tom Burke
 Her Forgotten Past (1933) as Donald Thorne
 The Thundering Herd (1933) as Smiley
 The Intruder (1933) as John Brandt
 Come On, Marines! (1934) as Lt. Allen
 The Last Round-Up (1934) as Jack Kells
 Wagon Wheels (1934) as Kenneth Murdock
 Student Tour (1934) as Jeff Kane - Bobby's Brother and Coach of the Crew
 The Lives of a Bengal Lancer (1935) as Hamzulla Khan
 On Probation (1935) as Al Murray
 G Men (1935) as Fingerprint Expert
 Social Error (1935) as Dean Carter
 The Test (1935) as Pepite LaJoie
 Trails of the Wild (1935) as Mountie Larry Doyle
 Wanderer of the Wasteland (1935) as Guerd Larey
 Hot Off the Press (1935)
 Nevada (1935) as Clem Dillon
 Desert Gold (1936) as Chetley 'Chet' Kasedon
 Treachery Rides the Range (1936) as Colonel Drummond
 Undersea Kingdom (1936, Serial) as Unga Khan
 Prison Shadows (1936) as Bert McNamee
 Mary of Scotland (1936) as Messenger
 Ride, Ranger, Ride (1936) as Duval, aka Chief Tavibo
 The Plainsman (1936) as Indian (uncredited)
 Song of the Gringo (1936) as Sheriff
 A Million to One (1937) as John Kent, Sr.
 Secret Agent X-9 (1937, Serial) as Baron Michael Karsten
 The Outcasts of Poker Flat (1937) as Indian Jim
 Rootin' Tootin' Rhythm (1937) as Joe Stafford
 High, Wide and Handsome (1937) as Oil Man (uncredited)
 Souls at Sea (1937) as Mate
 Sky Racket (1937) as Benjamin Arnold
 Thunder Trail (1937) as Jeff Graves
 A Damsel in Distress (1937) as Bit Role (uncredited)
 Born to the West (1937) as Bart Hammond
 Amateur Crook (1937) as Crone
 The Big Broadcast of 1938 (1938) as Passenger (uncredited)
 Cocoanut Grove (1938) as Minor Role (uncredited)
 The Great Adventures of Wild Bill Hickok (1938, Serial) as Mr. Cameron
 Rebellious Daughters (1938) as Charlie - alias Clint Houston
 Spawn of the North (1938) as Cannery Official (uncredited)
 The Mysterious Rider (1938) as Cap Folsom
 King of Alcatraz (1938) as Officer
 Touchdown, Army (1938) as Pilot (uncredited)
 Illegal Traffic (1938) as Captain Moran
 Hawk of the Wilderness (1938) as Yellow Weasel
 Tom Sawyer, Detective (1938) as Sheriff Walker
 Dodge City (1939) as John Barlow
 Frontier Pony Express (1939) as Cherokee
 Juarez (1939) as Lerdo de Tajada
 Union Pacific (1939) as Indian (uncredited)
 Port of Hate (1939) as Hammond
 Our Leading Citizen (1939) as Frank
 Geronimo (1939) as Interpreter
 Days of Jesse James (1939) as Train Passenger
 Road to Singapore (1940) as High Priest (uncredited)
 Mystery Sea Raider (1940) as Captain Norberg
 A Little Bit of Heaven (1940) as Uncle Pat
 Young Bill Hickok (1940) as Marshal Evans
 North West Mounted Police (1940) as Indian (uncredited)
 Texas Rangers Ride Again (1940) as Pablo Slide Along
 Arkansas Judge (1941) as Phil Johnson
 The Great Train Robbery (1941) as The Super
 Scattergood Pulls the Strings (1941) as Ben Mott
 Riders of Death Valley (1941) as Rance Davis
 Sunset in Wyoming (1941) as Jim Hayes
 Citadel of Crime (1941) as Minor Role (uncredited)
 Bad Man of Deadwood (1941) as Sheriff Jordan
 King of the Texas Rangers (1941, Serial) as Tom J. King Sr. [Ch. 1]
 New York Town (1941) as McAuliffe (uncredited)
 Sullivan's Travels (1941) as Policeman in Slums (uncredited)
 Law of the Timber (1941) as Hodge Mason
 Pacific Blackout (1941) as Colonel (uncredited)
 Treat 'Em Rough (1942) as Police Captain
 North to the Klondike (1942) as John Burke
 The Remarkable Andrew (1942) as Policeman (uncredited)
 Reap the Wild Wind (1942) as Officer at Tea (uncredited)
 Klondike Fury (1942) as Flight Dispatcher
 My Favorite Blonde (1942) as Policeman at Union Hall (uncredited)
 The Great Man's Lady (1942) as Man #2 - Hoyt City (uncredited)
 Secret Enemies (1942) as Hugo Mehl - the Doorman
 The Palm Beach Story (1942) as Mike the Doorman (uncredited)
 Across the Pacific (1942) as Dan Morton
 The Forest Rangers (1942) as Hotel Clerk (uncredited)
 I Married a Witch (1942) as Doorman (uncredited)
 The Hidden Hand (1942) as Matthews, the Undertaker (uncredited)
 Road to Morocco (1942) as Kasim's Aide (uncredited)
 Gentleman Jim (1942) as Gambler in "Lucky Guy" (uncredited)
 Casablanca (1942) as American (uncredited)
 The Hard Way (1943) as Man in Audience (uncredited)
 Truck Busters (1943) as Scrappy O'Brien
 Edge of Darkness (1943) as Petersen (uncredited)
 Mission to Moscow (1943) as Heckler (uncredited)
 Action in the North Atlantic (1943) as Seaman (uncredited)
 Pilot No. 5 (1943) as Bus Station Official (uncredited)
 Thank Your Lucky Stars (1943) as Bartender in Errol Flynn Number (uncredited)
 Northern Pursuit (1943) as Jean
 Passage to Marseille (1944) as Second Mate (uncredited)
 The Adventures of Mark Twain (1944) as Captain of 'Queen of Dixie' (uncredited)
 The Mask of Dimitrios (1944) as Abdul Dhris
 Janie (1944) as Policeman (uncredited)
 The Conspirators (1944) as Jennings (uncredited)
 The Horn Blows at Midnight (1945) as The Chef (uncredited)
 Escape in the Desert (1945) as Sheriff (uncredited)
 Danger Signal (1945) as Policeman in Car (uncredited)
 Saratoga Trunk (1945) as Fireman on Train (uncredited)
 San Antonio (1945) as Cleve Andrews
 Cinderella Jones (1946) as Jailer
 A Stolen Life (1946) as Mr. Lippencott (uncredited)
 Her Kind of Man (1946) as Lake (uncredited)
 Janie Gets Married (1946) as Drapery Man (uncredited)
 Two Guys from Milwaukee (1946) as Broadcast Director (uncredited)
 Shadow of a Woman (1946) as Mike
 Never Say Goodbye (1946) as Policeman (uncredited)
 Humoresque (1946) as Moving Man (uncredited)
 The Time, the Place and the Girl (1946) as Stage Manager (uncredited)
 The Man I Love (1947) as Cop (uncredited)
 The Unfaithful (1947) as Businessman with Hunter (uncredited)
 That Way with Women (1947) as MacPherson
 Bells of San Fernando (1947) as Governor Don Sebastian Fernando
 Stallion Road (1947) as Horse Rancher (uncredited)
 Possessed (1947) as Norris
 Cheyenne (1947) as Timberline
 Life with Father (1947) as The Policeman
 My Wild Irish Rose (1947) as Replacement Barman (uncredited)
 Speed to Spare (1948) as Bit Role (scenes deleted)
 Silver River (1948) as 'Buck' Chevigee
 The Big Punch (1948) as Police Lt. Ryan (uncredited)
 Key Largo (1948) as Sheriff Ben Wade
 Two Guys from Texas (1948) as Pete Nash
 Johnny Belinda (1948) as Ben (uncredited)
 Adventures of Don Juan (1948) as Turnkey (uncredited)
 Flaxy Martin (1949) as Joe, Detective
 South of St. Louis (1949) as Capt. Jeffrey
 Homicide (1949) as Sheriff George
 The Younger Brothers (1949) as Deputy Joe
 Colorado Territory (1949) as U.S. Marshal (uncredited)
 Look for the Silver Lining (1949) as St. Clair - Actor in 'Uncle Tom's Cabin' (uncredited)
 The Fountainhead (1949) as Gas Station Executive (uncredited)
 Ranger of Cherokee Strip (1949) as Chief Hunter
 The Big Wheel (1949) as Deacon Jones
 Montana (1950) as Charlie Penrose (uncredited)
 The Blonde Bandit (1950) as Police Chief Ramsey
 Backfire (1950) as Detective Sgt. Pluther (uncredited)
 Colt .45 (1950) as Townsman (uncredited)
 The Iroquois Trail (1950) as Chief Sagamore
 This Side of the Law (1950) as The Sheriff
 Dallas (1950) as Tarrant County Sheriff (uncredited)
 Three Desperate Men (1951) as Marshal Pete Coleman
 Snake River Desperadoes (1951) as Jim Haverly
 Warpath (1951) as First Emigrant
 Gold Raiders (1951) as John Sawyer
 The Sea Hornet (1951) as Lt. Drake
 Rose of Cimarron (1952) as Lone Eagle
 The Story of Will Rogers (1952) as Oklahoma Delegate (uncredited)
 Hangman's Knot (1952) as Maxwell
 The System (1953) as Man at Hearing (uncredited)
 The Last Posse (1953) as Uncle Will Kane (uncredited)
 Ride, Vaquero! (1953) as Bartender (uncredited)
 The Boy from Oklahoma (1954) as Townsman (uncredited)
 Apache (1954) as Geronimo
 Adventures of the Texas Kid: Border Ambush (1954) as Sheriff

References

External links

Literature on Monte Blue
Monte Blue portraits in the J. Willis Sayre collection of the University of Washington

1887 births
1963 deaths
American male film actors
American male silent film actors
Male actors from Indianapolis
Purdue University alumni
Male actors from Los Angeles
20th-century American male actors
Warner Bros. contract players
American people of Osage descent
Burials at Forest Lawn Memorial Park (Glendale)
People from Rush County, Indiana
American people of Cherokee descent